Andaleeve Rahman Partho (born 20 April 1974) is the president of the Bangladesh Jatiya Party, a Member of Parliament and the principal of British School of Law in Dhaka.

Early life
Andaleeve Rahman was born on 20 April 1974 in Dhaka, Bangladesh. His father, Naziur Rahman Manzur, was a politician and former minister who served as the founding chairman of the Bangladesh Jatiya Party and as the Mayor of Dhaka. They belonged to a Bengali Muslim family known as the Taluqdars of Balia in Bhola Island. Through his paternal grandfather Bazlur Rahman Taluqdar, Andaleeve Rahman was a direct descendant of Munga Khan, an eighteenth-century who arrived in Bengal from Garmsir in Afghanistan who settled in the village of Saluka in greater Barisal. Khan's son, Shaykh Muhammad, served as a revenue officer for the Mughal emperors, earning the title of shiqdar and receiving a kharija taluq in Bhola's Balia and Gazaria areas, where the family established themselves as taluqdars. Andaleeve Rahman's mother Sheikh Reba was the niece of Sheikh Mujibur Rahman, and through her grandfather Sheikh Lutfar Rahman, Andaleeve was a direct descendant of the 15th-century Iraqi Arab Muslim preacher Sheikh Awwal of Baghdad. His paternal uncle, Dr. Azizur Rahman, is a notable scientist.

Education
Andaleeve was a student at St. Joseph High School and later at Government Laboratory High School before moving to London to earn his Bachelor of Laws degree.

Career
Rahman passed the Bar Examination at Lincoln's Inn in the 5th. He then returned to the country and joined as an apprentice under the supervision of Barrister Rafiqul Haque and worked with him for five years. He is currently working as a lawyer in Dhaka and serves as principal of the British School of Law in Dhaka.

Rahman has been actively involved in politics with his father, Najiur Rahman Manju, for over 25 years. When his father died on 27 April, Andalib was elected chairman of the Bangladesh Jatiya Party. In the ninth parliamentary election of the 24th, Bhola-1 was elected as a candidate for the four-party alliance, and Awami League candidate Yusuf Hossain defeated Humayun and won. His party boycotted the election under the leadership of the BNP in the election of 2014. He became a candidate for the unity front and the 25-party alliance in the Dhaka-1 constituency in the 11th parliamentary elections. He collected nomination papers in Dhaka-17 and Bhola-3 seats.

References

Further reading
 

Living people
1974 births
Sheikh Mujibur Rahman family
Members of Lincoln's Inn
Alumni of the University of London
Bangladesh Jatiya Party politicians
9th Jatiya Sangsad members
People from Bhola District
Bangladeshi people of Afghan descent
Bangladeshi people of Arab descent